Vangelis Khrysafis (1915 – 1996) was a Greek sports shooter. He competed at the 1948 Summer Olympics and 1956 Summer Olympics.

References

1915 births
1996 deaths
Greek male sport shooters
Olympic shooters of Greece
Shooters at the 1948 Summer Olympics
Shooters at the 1956 Summer Olympics
Sportspeople from Athens
20th-century Greek people